John Reeve may refer to:

 John Reeve (religious leader) (1608–1658), English plebeian prophet
 John Reeve (actor) (1799–1838), English comic actor
 John Reeve (businessman), executive with Willis Group Holdings
 John N. Reeve, American microbiologist
 John Reeve (bobsleigh) (born 1937), bobsledder who represented the United States Virgin Islands
 John Bunyan Reeve (1831–1916), Presbyterian minister and professor at Howard University

See also
John Reeves (disambiguation)